La Société Française de Parasitologie, often abridged as SFP, was founded in 1962 and is a scientific society devoted to parasitology.  It publishes the scientific journal Parasite and organizes prizes and annual meetings.

History 
The Society was created at a meeting hold on April 7, 1962 at the Muséum National d’Histoire Naturelle in Paris, called by Jacques Callot (from Strasbourg), Jean Biguet (from Lille), Alain Chabaud (from Paris), and Claude Dupuis (from Paris). Among the 25 founding members were Lucien Brumpt, Pierre Paul Grassé, Edouard Brygoo, Jean-Marie Doby, Louis Euzet, Hervé Harant and Jean-Antoine Rioux.

Publications 
The Society published from 1981 to 1999 the Bulletin de la Société Française de Parasitologie, now extinct.

Since 1994, the Society publishes the scientific journal Parasite. The journal was published as a printed journal from 1994 to 2012 and is an online open-access journal since 2013.

List of presidents

 1962-1976: Robert-Philippe Dollfus
 1976-1982: Jean Biguet
 1982-1999: Jean-Antoine Rioux
 1998-2002: René Houin
 2001-2004: Philippe Dorchies
 2003-2007: Gérard Duvallet
 2006-2011: Marie-Laure Dardé
 2012-2017: Pascal Boireau
 2017-2018: Laurence Delhaes
 2018-2019: Coralie Martin
 2020 -: Isabelle Villena

External links
 
 Official website of the journal Parasite 
 Website of the annual meeting in 2019, in Tours, France
 Website of the annual meeting in 2021 in Lyon, France

Scientific societies based in France
Zoology organizations
Biology societies
Scientific organizations established in 1962
Medical associations based in France
1962 establishments in France
Organizations based in Paris